Abu Naser Muhammad Ehsanul Haque Milan (March 26, 1957) is a Bangladesh Nationalist Party politician, a former member of parliament from the Chandpur-1 constituency and the state minister of Ministry of Education.

Family background
Milan was born in Comilla,  Bangladesh. His father Obaidul Haque was a government officer and his mother Mahmuda Haque is a housewife. His wife Nazmun Nahar Baby graduated from the zoology department of Dhaka University and is currently the vice-president of the central committee of Bangladesh Jatiotabadi Mohila Dal.

Education
Milan completed 'Secondary education' from Sher-e-Bangla Nagar Government Boys' High School and 'Higher secondary education' from Government Intermediate Technical College (at present Government Science College). After graduation from the department of chemistry, University of Dhaka, he moved to United States for higher education in 1982. He achieved an MBA degree from the New York Institute of Technology. At the same time, he served as an adjunct lecturer in Brooklyn College and Borough of Manhattan Community College and worked as a chemist in Super Farm Pharmaceutical Industry. In 2018, he was awarded a PhD in political science from International Islamic University Malaysia. His PhD thesis is about "Human Capital and Socio-Economic Development: The Role of Technical and Vocational Education and Training in Bangladesh".

Career
Milan was the founder convener of BNP-USA chapter and secretary of US-BNP until 1996. In the meantime, he was chosen as the International Affairs Secretary by Khaleda Zia in 1993.

Milan became a parliament member for the first time in the 7th national parliament election held in 1996 from the constituency 260, Chandpur-1, Kachua. In the election of 8th national parliament held in 2001, he defeated the Awami League candidate former minister Muhiuddin Khan Alamgir with a large margin. Prime Minister Begum Khaleda Zia appointed Milan as the state minister for education. After being responsible for Chandpur, he started a movement called Jatka Nidhon Protirodh Andolon (Stop Killing Small Hilsa Fish) in his own initiative.

On 5 June 2012, Milan had secured bail from a court and left Bangladesh. On 23 November 2018, he was arrested in Chittagong in 25 cases filed against him in connection with murder, smugging and vandalism.

References

Living people
People from Chandpur District
Bangladesh Nationalist Party politicians
7th Jatiya Sangsad members
8th Jatiya Sangsad members
State Ministers of Education (Bangladesh)
Date of birth missing (living people)
Place of birth missing (living people)
University of Dhaka alumni
1957 births
Brooklyn College faculty